Mediator complex subunit 19 (Med19) is a protein that in humans is encoded by the MED19 gene.

Function

The protein encoded by this gene is a subunit of the Mediator complex, which binds to gene-specific regulatory factors and provides support for the basal RNA polymerase II transcription machinery. This gene has been implicated in the growth of several types of cancer, and inhibition of its expression inhibits the growth and spread of these cancers. Two transcript variants encoding different isoforms have been found for this gene. [provided by RefSeq, Nov 2015].

See also 
Mediator

References

Further reading